Coryphaena is a genus of marine ray-finned fishes known as the dolphinfishes, and is currently the only known genus in the family Coryphaenidae. The generic name is from Greek κορυφή (koryphē, "crown, top") and -αινα (-aina, feminine suffix). Species in this genus have compressed heads and single dorsal fins that run the entire length of the fishes' bodies.

Dolphinfish are aggressive predatory fish that actively prey upon oceanic forage fishes, while in turn serving as a primary food source for many larger pelagic predators.

Despite the name, dolphinfishes are unrelated to and look unlike dolphins (which are marine mammals with pointed snouts), and commercially their meat is often labeled with its Hawaiian name mahi-mahi to reduce possible public confusion.  The origin of the name "dolphinfish" is recent, to avoid confusion with dolphins, as the traditional name of the fish was also "dolphin". Why the mammal and the fish were both called "dolphin" is uncertain, but theories include that dolphinfish communicate using high-pitched sounds similar to a dolphin, and they are about the size of a small dolphin, or due to dorado (Spanish for "golden") having been purportedly used historically in Spanish for both dolphins (normally delfín) and dolphinfish.

Species
The currently recognized species in this genus are:

 Names brought to synonymy
 Coryphaena elegans Cuvier, 1833, a synonym for Luvarus imperialis Rafinesque, 1810

See also
 List of fish families

References

 

 
Coryphaenidae
Carangiformes
Marine fish genera
Taxa named by Carl Linnaeus

Lambuka Fishing